George Owen Redington (April 30, 1871 – April 17, 1958) was an American football player, coach, and lawyer.  He served as the head football coach at Syracuse University from 1895 to 1896, compiling a record of 11–5–4.  Redington graduated from Yale Law School in 1895 and joined the law firm of Carter, Hughes & Dwight in New York, where he worked under Charles Evans Hughes.  He served as assistant corporation counsel of New York during the administration of Fiorello H. La Guardia, Mayor of New York City.  Redington was a veteran of the Spanish–American War.  He died at Danbury Hospital in Danbury, Connecticut on April 17, 1958.

Head coaching record

References

External links
 

1871 births
1958 deaths
19th-century players of American football
Syracuse Orange football coaches
Syracuse Orange football players
New York (state) lawyers
Yale Law School alumni
American military personnel of the Spanish–American War
Players of American football from New York City
Players of American football from Syracuse, New York
Lawyers from New York City